In mathematics, topological complexity of a topological space X (also denoted by TC(X)) is a topological invariant closely connected to the motion planning problem, introduced by Michael Farber in 2003.

Definition
Let X be a topological space and  be the space of all continuous paths in X. Define the projection 
The topological complexity is the minimal number k such that
for each , there exists a local section

Examples
The topological complexity: TC(X) = 1 if and only if X is contractible. 
The topological complexity of the sphere  is 2 for n odd and 3 for n even. For example, in the case of the circle , we may define a path between two points to be the geodesic between the points, if it is unique. Any pair of antipodal points can be connected by a counter-clockwise path.
If  is the configuration space of n distinct points in the Euclidean m-space, then

The topological complexity of the Klein bottle is 5.

References

 
Armindo Costa: Topological Complexity of Configuration Spaces, Ph.D. Thesis, Durham University (2010), online

Topology

ko:단면 범주#위상 복잡도